Grand Larceny is a 1987 thriller film directed by Jeannot Szwarc and starring Marilu Henner, Ian McShane, Omar Sharif and Louis Jourdan.

Plot summary
Freddy Grand, a woman estranged from her father for 18 years, travels to his estate on the French Riviera after learning of his death. There she carries out his final wishes and begins to learn something about his past. She discovers he was a thief who served time in prison, but was approached by an insurance company on his release to employ his talent in helping them to recover some stolen valuables. A reformed man of many years before his death, he wishes Freddy to continue his work.

Cast
 Marilu Henner - Freddy Grand
 Ian McShane - Flanagan
 Omar Sharif - Rashid Saud
 Louis Jourdan - Charles Grand
 Phillip Tan - Shomin

References

External links
 
 

1987 films
1980s heist films
1987 thriller films
British heist films
French heist films
American heist films
British thriller films
French thriller films
American thriller films
English-language French films
Films directed by Jeannot Szwarc
Films set in France
Films set on the French Riviera
1980s English-language films
1980s American films
1980s British films
1980s French films